Acacia filifolia is a shrub belonging to the genus Acacia and the subgenus Juliflorae that is endemic to western Australia.

Description
It is either single-stemmed or sparingly branched toward the base of the plant. The straight to slightly flexuose branchlets have resinous ribbing located at the subpendulous extremities. The slender yellow-green phyllodes are ascending and incurved with a quadrangular to subquadrangular shape. It blooms from May to September producing yellow flowers. The hairy pods are firmly chartaceous with glabrous yellow coloured margins.

Taxonomy
The species was first formally described by the botanist George Bentham in 1842 as part of William Jackson Hooker's work Notes on Mimoseae, with a synopsis of species as published in the London Journal of Botany. It was reclassified as Racosperma filifolium by Leslie Pedley in 2003 then transferred back to genus Acacia in 2006. The specific epithet (filifolia) is derived from the Latin words filum meaning "thread" and folium meaning "a leaf", possibly referring to the slender phyllodes.

Distribution
It is native to an area in the Wheatbelt region of Western Australia from around Coorow in the north west to around Southern Cross in the south west and has a scattered distribution. It is found on sand plains growing in gravelly to sandy soils around laterite as a part of shrubland communities.

See also
List of Acacia species

References

filifolia
Acacias of Western Australia
Plants described in 1842
Taxa named by George Bentham